The Mikulin AM-39 was a 1940s Soviet aircraft piston engine. Representing a high-output version of the AM-35A, AM-39 was used on the Mikoyan-Gurevich I-220 and Polikarpov ITP fighters, and the Tupolev SDB bomber.

Specifications (AM-39FN)
{{pistonspecs|

|ref=Kotelnikov'.
|type=12-cylinder 60° Vee aircraft piston engine
|bore=160 mm (6.30 in)
|stroke=190mm/196.7mm (7.48 in/7.744 in) different between right and left cylinder bank due to articulated connecting rods
|displacement=46.66 L (2,847 in³)
|length=
|diameter=
|width=
|height=
|weight=970 kg (2,138 lb)
|valvetrain=
|supercharger=Two-speed centrifugal type supercharger with aftercooler
|turbocharger=
|fuelsystem=Direct injection
|fueltype=
|oilsystem=
|coolingsystem=Liquid-cooled
|power=1,588 kW (2,130 hp)
|specpower=34 kW/L (0.75 hp/in³)
|compression=
|fuelcon=
|specfuelcon=
|oilcon=
|power/weight=
}}

See also

References

Notes

Bibliography

 Gunston, Bill. World Encyclopedia of Aero Engines. Cambridge, England. Patrick Stephens Limited, 1989. 
 Kotelnikov, Vladimir. Russian Piston Aero Engines''. Marlborough, Wiltshire. The Crowood Press Ltd. 2005. .

1940s aircraft piston engines
Mikulin aircraft engines